The 2022 Tre Valli Varesine was the 101st edition of the Tre Valli Varesine road cycling one day race, which was held in the Lombardy region of northwestern Italy on 4 October 2022. The race was the third of the 2022 Trittico Lombardo, which also included the Coppa Ugo Agostoni, held on 29 September and the Coppa Bernocchi held the day before.

Teams 
16 of the 19 UCI WorldTeams and nine UCI ProTeams made up the 25 teams that participated in the race. In total, 171 riders started the race, of which only 101 finished.

UCI WorldTeams

 
 
 
 
 
 
 
 
 
 
 
 
 
 
 
 

UCI ProTeams

Result

References

External links 
 

2022
Tre Valli Varesine
Tre Valli Varesine
Tre Valli Varesine